Krogerus is one of the largest business law firms in Finland. It is headquartered in Helsinki and has offices in Kuopio and Turku. The firm's revenue was approximately EUR 52 million, as of the financial period ending 31 March 2022. Krogerus employs approximately 255 professionals.

The firms practice covers a broad spectrum of transactional, dispute resolution and regulatory matters. Krogerus has a particularly strong focus in the energy, finance, food and beverage, healthcare, real estate, technology and telecommunications sectors. Krogerus is regularly retained in some of the most challenging and high-profile assignments in the Finnish market.

Rankings and recognition
Krogerus' lawyers are ranked in the top tiers by leading legal guides such as Chambers & Partners, The Legal 500 and IFLR 1000. 

Krogerus has one of the largest and most active corporate/M&A practice groups in the Finnish market; the firm has ranked in the top of Mergermarket's M&A league tables for Finland by deal count for several years.

The firm's partners have also received awards such as Best Lawyers "Lawyer of the Year"  and the International Law Office (ILO) Client Choice Award.

Main practice areas
The firm's main practice areas include:
Banking & Finance
Capital Markets
Commercial Contracts and Outsourcing
Competition and Regulatory
Compliance, Investigations and Corporate Offences
Corporate Advisory
Dispute Resolution
Employment & Benefits
Energy
Environment
Intellectual Property
Mergers & Acquisitions
Private Equity
Public Procurement
Real Estate & Construction
Restructuring and Insolvency
Tax
Technology & Data Protection

Main industrial sectors
The firm's main industrial sectors include:
Energy & Infrastructure
Financial Institutions & Insurance
Food & Beverage
Healthcare & Pharmaceuticals
Machinery & Engineering
Public Sector
Real Estate
Retail & Consumer Goods
Technology, Media & Telecommunications
Transportation & Logistics

References

External links

Law firms of Finland